Jan Petržela  (born 24 September 1992) is a Czech orienteer.

He won a silver medal in the relay with the Czech team at the 2014 European Orienteering Championships in Palmela, and a bronze medal in the relay at the 2016 European Orienteering Championships in Jesenik.

At the 2017 World Orienteering Championships in Tartu, Estonia, he placed 22nd in the middle distance, 25th in the sprint final, and 11th in the relay with the Swiss team.

References

External links
 
 Jan Petržela at World of O Runners

1992 births
Living people
Czech orienteers
Foot orienteers
Competitors at the 2017 World Games
Junior World Orienteering Championships medalists